Dog Kung Fu, i.e. Gǒuquán, i.e. Dìshùquán, is a martial arts style native to Fujian province China. While sharing many similar features to styles like Wuzuquan, Huzunquan, and many others from the same region, this southern style of Chinese boxing has the unique feature of specializing in takedowns, Chin Na, and ground fighting while often taking advantage of utilizing techniques from an inferior position. This martial art also teaches Iron Shirt and Iron Palm fighting methods as well as specialized leaping techniques. Its creation is traditionally credited to a Buddhist nun who developed the style to defend herself from bandits on her travels.

Origins
One of the legends on the origins of Dog Kung Fu says that in the southern area of China in Fujian Province, resided the White Lotus temple, where often the nuns who were admitted previously lived secular lives. At that time women were often subjugated to the practice of foot binding. Therefore, any practice that required standing physical exertion was difficult in the least and practically impossible at worst. In response to these physical constraints, the nuns developed a system of fighting that they could use to defend themselves from bandits and wild animals. During the Qing Dynasty imperial regime's destruction of the temples, a nun by the name of Si Yue had left White Lotus Temple and traveled to the northern areas of the province. Supposedly she had fallen ill in the Yongtai region near Fuzhou, it was there that she was assisted by the Chen Family who took care of her until recovery. As she was indebted to the Chen Family she remained and taught their son, Chen Biao, Gouquan. The Chen family kept this art a family secret for several generations.

Another legend suggests that the famous Fong Sai-Yuk was a master of Dishuquan and had passed his skills to monks in the Zhuyuansi Temple (nowadays known as Guanyuan Temple), this was passed through various generations until a monk named Hui Kai taught the style to Zheng Yishan.

Chen Yijiu
During the early years of the Republic of China, Chen Ayin, a descendant of Chen Biao, fled to Singapore to escape imprisonment for accidental manslaughter when defending a friend against a village troublemaker. He was taken in by one of the Chinese immigrants, Chen Yijiu. Being ever grateful, Chen Ayin taught Chen Yijiu his art without reservation.

Chen Yijiu, already having learnt martial arts such as Muay Thai, Dragon Kung Fu, and Zui Quan, spent several years refining the techniques in Dishuquan and building himself a reputation in Southeast Asia as the "Iron Leg". He left Singapore in 1932 and moved to Xiyuan village in Fuzhou,  where he resided until his death in 1997.  There, he spent the rest of his years teaching Dishuquan, spreading the art around and through Fuzhou.

References

External links
 Sifu Tom Wong master in Dishuquan and Wing Chun
 Fujian Shaolin Dog Boxing information
 Taiping Fujian Dishu Quan (Dog Boxing)
 Jiu xiang Dishu Dog Techniques

Training books
 FuJian Shaolin Dog Boxing by Chen Zhi Fan (TC 515)
 Shaolin Dog Style Boxing Manual by Ding Xiao Se (TC 509)
  Fukien Ground Boxing: Nan Shaoling Leg Techniques (Chinese Martial Arts) by Chu-Xian Cai (Author), Mei Xue-Xiong (Translator)

Images and videos
 Di Tang Ground Boxing 地趟 (VCD#755)

Chinese martial arts
Fujian Nanquan
Buddhist nuns
Buddhist martial arts